The 2012–13 Krylia Sovetov Samara season was the 19th straight season that the club played in the Russian Premier League, the highest tier of football in Russia. They also played in the 2012–13 Russian Cup, getting eliminated by Anzhi Makhachkala in the Round of 16.

Krylia Sovetov started the season under the management of Andrey Kobelev. He resigned on 15 November 2012, resulting in Aleksandr Tsygankov taking charge in a caretaker capacity until 27 January 2013 when they appointed Gadzhi Gadzhiev as their permanent manager.

Squad

On Loan

Reserve squad

Transfers

Summer

In:

Out:

Winter

In:

Out:

Competitions

Russian Premier League

Results

Table

Relegation play-offs

Russian Cup

Squad statistics

Appearances and goals

|-
|colspan="14"|Players who left Krylia Sovetov Samara on loan during the season:

|-
|colspan="14"|Players who left Krylia Sovetov Samara during the season:

|}

Top scorers

Disciplinary record

References

PFC Krylia Sovetov Samara seasons
Rostov